Judeo-Egyptian Arabic is an Arabic dialect spoken by Egyptian Jews. It is close to the dialect of Alexandria, even for speakers in Cairo.

Notes 

Jews and Judaism in Egypt
Judeo-Arabic languages
Endangered Afroasiatic languages
Languages of Egypt
Jewish Egyptian history